Anthony Osorio (born April 13, 1994) is a Canadian professional soccer player who last played as a defender and midfielder for the Mississauga MetroStars in the Major Arena Soccer League.

Club career 
Osorio attended St. Edmund Campion where he represented the school team, having grown up in Brampton, Ontario. He was part of the team that won the school's second and third Ontario Federation of Schools Athletic Association Championship in four years.

In 2013 after a successful trial in Uruguay Osorio joined the u19 side of Nacional. Then moved up to the reserve team the following year in 2014.

Toronto FC II
He joined the Toronto FC Academy in July 2014, and helped the club to become League1 Ontario champions and Inter-Provincial Cup Championship winners. Osorio was rewarded with a USL pro contract on December 9, 2015, joining Toronto FC II and going on to make 19 appearances in his inaugural season. The midfielder made his professional debut on April 25, 2015, playing in a match against the Pittsburgh Riverhounds in the USL. Osorio would spend three seasons with the club prior to be released at the conclusion of the 2017 season.

Post-TFC
In 2018, he played for Vaughan Azzurri in League1 Ontario.  After that he joined the  Mississauga MetroStars of the Major Arena Soccer League.

International career 
Osorio represented Canada at the 2013 Francophone games in Nice, France. He made his international debut in a friendly as a halftime substitute vs Cameroon that ended in a 0–0 draw. Osorio made his first international start and recorded his first international goal in a 1–0 win over Rwanda on September 8, 2013.

Personal life 
Osorio's parents are Colombian – his father is a native of Cali, while his mother was born in Medellín. Osorio's older brother, Jonathan Osorio, plays for Toronto FC and represents the Canadian seniors. Osorio's younger brother, Nicholas, previously played in the Toronto FC system and represented the Canadian under-15s.

In 2018, Osorio suffered a nasty ACL tear which forced him to undergo surgery and not participate at all in the Metrostars' inaugural season as well as take all of 2019 off on the sidelines to recover from the tragic injury. Osorio was linked to a move to CPL side York 9 FC had the injury not occurred.

Career statistics

References

1994 births
Living people
Association football midfielders
Canada men's youth international soccer players
Canadian people of Colombian descent
Canadian soccer players
Soccer players from Brampton
Soccer players from Toronto
Toronto FC II players
USL Championship players
Mississauga MetroStars players
Vaughan Azzurri players
Toronto FC players
Major Arena Soccer League players